This is a list of private schools in the Czech Republic.

Pardubice Region
Upper Secondary Industrial School of Chemistry

Karlovy Vary Region
Carlsbad International School

Moravian-Silesian Region
1st International School of Ostrava
Beskydy Mountain Academy
Juliusz Słowacki Polish Grammar School

Olomouc Region
Soukromé gymnázium Olomouc

Prague
Banking Institute / College of Banking (Bankovní Institut Vysoká Škola, a.s.)
Brno International Business School
The English College in Prague
English International School, Prague
Gymnázium Christiana Dopplera
Gymnázium Jana Keplera
International School of Prague
Jan Neruda Grammar School
Lauder Schools of Prague
Park Lane International School
Prague British School
Riverside School, Prague
Christian International School of Prague

South Bohemian Region
Townshend International School

Ústí nad Labem Region
Gymnasium Kadaň

See also

Education in the Czech Republic
List of universities in the Czech Republic

 
Czech Republic
Czech Republic
Schools
Schools
Schools